Ahmed Al-Akberi (Arabic:أحمد العكبري) (born 15 July 1997) is an Emirati footballer. He currently plays as a midfielder former Al-Wahda.

Career
Al-Akberi started his career at Al-Wahda and is a product of the Al-Wahda's youth system. On 12 March 2015, Al-Akberi made his professional debut for Al Wahda against Al-Wasl in the Pro League, replacing Mohamed Al-Shehhi.  On 18 October 2018, He had a serious traffic accident  On 9 December 2018,Al-Akberi declares that he will not be able to play football again

References

External links
 

1997 births
Living people
Emirati footballers
Al Wahda FC players
UAE Pro League players
Association football midfielders
Place of birth missing (living people)